Micronics (マイクロニクス Maikuronikusu) was a Japanese video game developer in 1980s and 1990s. It mostly ported arcade games to the Nintendo Entertainment System. Like many video game developers, Micronics didn't credit itself in its games, displaying instead only the name of the video game publisher (with exception of Super Volleyball for the Sega Mega Drive).

While the company is not well known in the game industry, it has produced some obscure titles like 89 Dennou Kyusei Uranai.  Kazuo (Kazzo) Yagi was the main programmer for the games during the NES era. The company hired professional musicians to compose music for its games such as Tsugutoshi Goto, Kimio Nomura, and Joe Hisaishi.

The company started to develop SNES games, again uncredited. However, some of its games credited Khaos in the ROM, which is believed to have been Micronics's name while developing SNES games.

Video games 
Micronics developed primarily for the Nintendo Entertainment System and, to a lesser extent, the Super Nintendo Entertainment System and Sega Mega Drive.

Nintendo Entertainment System
1942 
'89 Dennō Kyūsei Uranai
Athena
Elevator Action
Exed Exes
Geimos
Ghosts 'n Goblins 
Ikari Warriors
Ikari Warriors II: Victory Road
Miracle Ropitt: 2100-Nen no Daibōken
Mottomo Abunai Deka
Onyanko Town
SonSon 
Stick Hunter
Super Pitfall
Thundercade
Tiger Heli
Twin Cobra

Super Nintendo Entertainment System
 Raiden Trad
 Acrobat Mission
 Spriggan Powered

Sega Mega Drive
 F1 Circus MD
 Super Volleyball

Note

References

External links
 GDRI article

Defunct video game companies of Japan